{{safesubst:#invoke:RfD||2=Eucharist, as a Sacrifice|month = March
|day =  7
|year = 2023
|time = 23:40
|timestamp = 20230307234051

|content=
REDIRECT Eucharist

}}